Clayton-le-Moors is a village in Hyndburn, Lancashire, England.  It contains 16 listed buildings, which are designated by English Heritage and recorded in the National Heritage List for England. Of these, one is listed at Grade II*, the middle grade, and the others are at Grade II.  Before the arrival of the Leeds and Liverpool Canal in about 1800 the area was mainly rural, and the older listed buildings are large houses, farmhouses, and associated structures.  Associated with the canal are a warehouse, office, house and stables.  The newer listed buildings include a church and its vicarage, and a war memorial.

Key

Buildings

References

Citations

Sources

Lists of listed buildings in Lancashire
Buildings and structures in Hyndburn